The House of Windisch-Graetz, also spelled Windisch-Grätz, is an Austrian aristocratic family, descending from Windischgraz in Lower Styria (present-day Slovenj Gradec, Slovenia). The noble dynasty serving the House of Habsburg achieved the rank of Freiherren in 1551, of Imperial Counts in 1682 and of Princes of the Holy Roman Empire in 1804. The family belongs to high nobility.

History

According to the Almanach de Gotha, the family was first recorded in 1242. They temporarily served as ministeriales of the Patriarchs of Aquileia, owners of Slovenj Gradec until the mid 14th century. One Conrad of Windischgracz (d. 1339) acted as a Habsburg administrator in the Habsburg Duchy of Styria from 1323 onwards. The family owned Thal, Styria a former Von Graben possession, between 1315 and 1605. 

In 1574 the dynasty obtained Inkolat in Bohemia; later, however, several members converted to Lutheranism and lost their estates in the course of the Thirty Years' War. The Austrian diplomat Gottlieb of Windisch-Graetz (1630–1695) again converted to Roman Catholicism in 1682 and was elevated to the rank of Count of the Holy Roman Empire by Leopold I, Holy Roman Emperor, in the same year. In 1693 his son Ernest Frederick (1670–1727) acquired Červená Lhota Castle in Southern Bohemia, which his descendant Joseph Nicholas of Windisch-Graetz (1744–1802) had to sell in 1755. 

In 1781 the family bought their new main seat, the West Bohemian Tachov. Count Alfred Candidus Ferdinand zu Windisch-Graetz (1787–1862) became the representative of the emperor at the Reichstag and was elevated to the rank of Fürst (Prince of the Holy Roman Empire) in 1804. In order to obtain imperial immediacy (and be himself a voting member of the Imperial Diet), he acquired the small imperial territories of Siggen and Eglofs in Southern Germany. This principality however was mediatized to the Kingdom of Württemberg only two years later, when the Confederation of the Rhine was established. Prince Alfred I later became a Field Marshal in the Austrian army.

Alfred and his brother Weriand were both created Princes of the Austrian Empire in 1822, with Alfred and his successors being the first line of Princes of Windisch-Graetz, and Weriand and his successors being the second line. Alfred acquired the former monastery at Kladruby (Tachov District). His grandson Alfred III, Prince of Windisch-Grätz, was an influential politician. He was succeeded by his nephew Ludwig Aladar, the owner of Sárospatak Castle, Hungary. 

Weriand, with the help of the rich dowry of his mother, Maria Leopoldine of Arenberg, acquired numerous castles in what is now Slovenia. After World War II, the estates in the Czechoslovak Republic as well as in Hungary and Yugoslavia were confiscated by communist regimes. The estate of Siggen is still owned by the elder line.

Great Britain's Princess Michael of Kent is descended from this family through her maternal grandmother, while her husband Prince Michael of Kent is a first cousin once removed of Archduchess Sophie Franziska of Austria, Princess of Windisch-Graetz.

(Mediatized) Princes of Windisch-Graetz 

Joseph Nicholas of Windisch-Graetz (1744–1802) was the father of both of the men whose lines are given below.

Elder Line 

  Alfred I (1787–1862), Count 1802–1804, 1st Prince 1804–1862
 Alfred II (1819–1876), 2nd Prince 1862–1876
  Alfred II (1851–1927), 3rd Prince 1876–1927
 Prince Ludwig (1830–1904)
  Ludwig Alfred (1882–1968), 4th Prince 1927–1968
  Ludwig Aladar (1908-1990), 5th Prince 1968-1990
 Prince Alfred (b. 1939) – renounced his succession rights in 1966
  Anton (born 1942), 6th Prince 1990–present
  Prince Joseph (1832–1906)
  Prince Franz (1867–1947)
  Prince Otto (1913–2011)
  Prince Johann-Nepomuck (b. 1953)

Younger Line 

  Weriand (1790–1867), 1st Prince 1822–1867
  Hugo (1823–1904), 2nd Prince 1867–1904 
 Hugo (1854–1920), 3rd Prince 1904–1920
 Hugo (1887–1959), 4th Prince 1920–1959
  Maximilian (1914–1976), 5th Prince 1959–1976
 Mariano Hugo (born 1955), 6th Prince 1976–present, married 1990 Archduchess Sophie Franziska of Austria
 Maximilian Hugo, Hereditary Prince of Windisch-Graetz (b. 1990) 
 Prince Alexis Ferdinand (1991-2010)
  Larissa Maria Grazia Helen Leontina Maria Luisa (b.1996)
  Prince Manfred (b. 1963)
 Prince Nicolò (b. 1997) 
  Prince Brando (b. 2008)
  Prince Alfred Weriand (1890–1972), married Princess Marie Isabella zu Hohenlohe-Langenburg
 Christiane Anna
 Gottfried Maximilian
  Hugo Weriand Antonius Franziskus Thomas Maria, married Caroline Knott
 Constantin Weriand Alfred Maria (b. 1962)
 Leopold Weriand
  Otto Atticus
  Franz Karl Weriand Gottlieb Albrecht Maria (b. 1964)
 Maximiliana Anastasia Christiane Isabella (b. 2004)
 Augustin George Veriand Franziskus Ferdinand (b. 2006)
  Princess Marie (1856–1929)
  Ernst Ferdinand of Windisch-Graetz (1827–1918), married Princess Kamilla Amalia Caroline Notgera zu Oettingen-Spielberg
  Karl Otto Hugo Weriand of Windisch-Graetz
 Otto Weriand of Windisch-Grätz, married Archduchess Elisabeth Marie of Austria
  Marie Gabriele of Windisch-Graetz

Coat of arms 
Gules, a wolf's head couped argent.

Notable family members 
 Joseph Nicholas of Windisch-Graetz (1744-1802), chamberlain of Marie Antoinette
 Alfred I, Prince of Windisch-Grätz (1787–1862), Austrian field marshal
 Alfred III, Prince of Windisch-Grätz (1851–1927), Austrian statesman
 Princess Marie of Windisch-Graetz (1856–1929), married Duke Paul Frederick of Mecklenburg in 1881
 Prince Otto Weriand of Windisch-Graetz (1873–1952), married Archduchess Elisabeth Marie of Austria
 Princess Stephanie of Windisch-Graetz (1909–2005), daughter of Prince Otto Weriand of Windisch-Graetz
 Stéphanie Windisch-Graetz (b. 1939), daughter of Prince Franz Joseph of Windisch-Graetz (son of Prince Otto Weriand)
 Mariano Hugo, Prince of Windisch-Graetz (b. 1955), married Archduchess Sophie Franziska of Austria in 1990
 Prince Arnold zu Windisch-Graetz (1929-2007), Lutheran pastor
 Princess Katalin zu Windisch-Graetz (b. 1947), Hungarian designer

Former family estates in present-day Slovenia

References

External links 

 
Austrian noble families